Chabal is a surname. Notable people with the surname include:

Patrick Chabal (1951–2014), Africanist
Sébastien Chabal (born 1977), French rugby union player